Clarence Bruce (September 26, 1924 – January 23, 1990) was an American baseball second baseman in the Negro leagues. He played with the Homestead Grays in 1947 and 1948. He also played in the Provincial League in 1949 and 1950 with the Farnham Pirates. His grave is at the Homewood Cemetery in Pittsburgh.

References

External links
 and Baseball-Reference Black Baseball stats and Seamheads

1924 births
1990 deaths
Homestead Grays players
Farnham Pirates players
Baseball players from Pennsylvania
Burials at Homewood Cemetery
20th-century African-American sportspeople
Baseball infielders